Muzaim (Müzayim) is a rural locality (a selo) in Derbentsky District, Republic of Dagestan, Russia. The population was 1,946 as of 2010. There are 17 streets.

Geography 
Muzaim is located 21 km south of Derbent (the district's administrative centre) by road. Rubas and Dyuzler are the nearest rural localities.

Nationalities 
Azerbaijanis live there.

References 

Rural localities in Derbentsky District